Hendrik Großöhmichen (born 6 June 1985) is a German former professional footballer who played as a midfielder.

References

External links
 
 

1985 births
Living people
German footballers
Association football midfielders
2. Bundesliga players
3. Liga players
Regionalliga players
Veikkausliiga players
Hannover 96 II players
VfL Osnabrück players
Holstein Kiel players
1. FC Magdeburg players
FC Hansa Rostock players
FC Lahti players
VfB Oldenburg players
German expatriate footballers
German expatriate sportspeople in Finland
Expatriate footballers in Finland
Footballers from Hanover